Anthony Kazadi better known as Kaza is a French rapper originating from Val de Fontenay, Val-de-Marne. Starting in a career in basketball, he moved to rapping with the 2018 series HRTBRK with notable chart success from his starts. Hew was signed to Elektra France and was close to Gambi and said he was greatly influenced by group XV Barbar. His freestyles series led to a first studio album Heartbreak Life on 6 March 2020, reaching the Top 10 in the French Albums Chart, followed by a deluxe edition on 23 October 2020 titled Heartbreak Life: Winter Edition. His second album T*X*C is set to drop on 30 April 2021.

Discography

Albums

Singles

Other songs

References

External links
Facebook

French rappers
Living people
Year of birth missing (living people)